Ambala Sadar is a city and a municipal council in Ambala district  in the state of Haryana, India.

Demographics
 India census, Ambala Sadar had a population of 106,378. Males constitute 52% of the population and females 48%. Ambala Sadar has an average literacy rate of 77%, higher than the national average of 59.5%; with 54% of the males and 46% of females literate. 11% of the population is under 6 years of age.

References

Cities and towns in Ambala district